Adetokunbo Kayode (born 31 October 1960)  is a Nigerian corporate lawyer, tax expert and international arbitrator.

Early life 
He attended CMS Grammar School, in Lagos. He studied law at the University of Lagos, Nigeria Law School, Lagos, Strategic Leadership at the Oxford and Cambridge Universities, Strategy and Public Communications at the World Bank/ Annenberg Program of the University of Southern California Libraries, as well as Strategic Negotiations training at Harvard University.

Career 
He is a Senior Advocate of Nigeri (SAN),  a Life Bencher (the highest legal rank and honor in Nigeria). He is a Fellow of the Chartered Institute of Arbitration, UK; Fellow of the Chartered Institute of Mediators and Conciliators of Nigeria; and Chartered Institute of Taxation of Nigeria.

He served the Federal government of Nigeria as cabinet minister in four different positions: Culture and Tourism; Labour: where he appointed Adesoji Adesugba as his Technical Advisor, Employment; Federal Attorney General and Hon Minister of Justice and as Minister of Defence.

He chairs the Peace and Security Committee of the Pan African Lawyers Union, Daresallam, Tanzania.

Kayode has business interests in law, agriculture, power and mining. He is on the board of the National Associations of Chambers of Commerce, Industry Mines and Agriculture of Nigeria, Nigerian Chamber of Mines, Nigeria Association of Investment Promotion Agencies.

He chairs the Boards of the Gemological Institute of Nigeria, Gems Miners and Marketers Association of Nigeria as well as the Board of Trustees of the National Association of Small Scale Industrialists and the Nigeria Private Sector Alliance. He represents the Nigeria Organised Private Sector (OPS) on Nigerian official delegations at international trade negotiations at the World Trade Organization, ACFTA, etc.

He was awarded Order of the Niger (CON) as well as the Distinguished Service Order (DSO) of the Republic of Liberia. He serves as president, Abuja Chamber of Commerce and Industry, Nigeria.

References

Nigerian ministers of tourism, culture and natural orientation
Defence ministers of Nigeria
Living people
Yoruba politicians
1958 births
University of Lagos alumni
People from Ondo State
Yoruba royalty
Nigerian royalty
Attorneys General of Nigeria
CMS Grammar School, Lagos alumni